Verkhnyaya Kazarma (Ürge Qaźarma) is a rural locality (a village) in Berdyashsky Selsoviet, Zilairsky District, Bashkortostan, Russia. The population was 12 as of 2010. There is 1 street.

Geography 
Verkhnyaya Kazarma is located 28 km southwest of Zilair (the district's administrative centre) by road. Kargala is the nearest rural locality.

References 

Rural localities in Zilairsky District